Baliram Bhagwan Sirskar is a member of the 13th Maharashtra Legislative Assembly.He represents the Balapur Assembly Constituency. He belongs to the BJP. Before he was in Vanchit Bahujan Aghadi

References

Maharashtra MLAs 2014–2019
Bharipa Bahujan Mahasangh politicians
Living people
People from Akola district
Marathi politicians
Year of birth missing (living people)

Vanchit Bahujan Aghadi politicians
Nationalist Congress Party politicians
Nationalist Congress Party politicians from Maharashtra